The 1000 km Buenos Aires was an endurance sports car event held in Buenos Aires, Argentina.  The race mostly run on the Autódromo Oscar Alfredo Gálvez, although it would run the Costanera circuit in 1957.  Besides a single race in Caracas, Venezuela, it was the only annual South American race in the history of the World Sportscar Championship.

History
In 1953, Formula One visited the newly built Autódromo in the center of Buenos Aires for the Argentine Grand Prix.  The race was successful enough for Formula One to return the following year, and it was also decided that the newly formed World Sportscar Championship would add the track to their schedule as a traditional season-opening event.  Following the 1000km Nürburgring the previous year, this would make the Buenos Aires round only the second  event in the series history.

A  circuit using long sections of the Avenida General Paz highway attached to the Autodromo section used only by Formula One would be used for the first 1000 km event. In 1955, an even longer section of the Autopista General Pablo Riccheri route would be added, making the circuit  in length before it returned to its original size once again in 1956. The event would move however in 1957, to the Costanera circuit before returning to the Autodromo in 1958. One final appearance was made by both Formula One and sports cars in 1960 before both chose not to return to Argentina for the time being.

The 1000 km event would return once more in 1970, as a non-championship exhibition round. The Autodromo had been expanded in 1968 to allow for a  circuit and eliminating the use of public highways. World Championship status would return again in 1971 while Formula One would also test the re-addition of the Argentine Grand Prix by holding their own exhibition race. The 1000 km sports car event would however be abandoned after the 1972 running, with the series eliminating several fly-away events in the coming years to cut costs.

Winners
The event was dominated by Ferraris, winning five out of the six runnings in the race's first incarnation before winning the final event once again in 1972.  American Phil Hill would be the only driver to win more than once.

† - Non-championship event.

References

 
Sports car races
Buenos Aires
Motorsport competitions in Argentina